Lincolnview Junior/Senior High School is a public junior and senior high school near Van Wert, Ohio, United States.  It is the only junior and senior high school in the Lincolnview Local School District. There are currently around 400 students enrolled in grades 7–12.

Athletics

Lincolnview is a member of the Northwest Conference (OHSAA). Lincolnview fields six varsity boys sports and five varsity girls sports. In addition, Lincolnview fields an indoor track and bowling team, but only as club sports.

State championships
 Baseball – 1962
 Boys basketball 1997

References

External links
 

High schools in Van Wert County, Ohio
Public high schools in Ohio